Terra Cotta (or terracotta) is a clay-based ceramic material, and objects made in it.

Terra Cotta or terracotta may also refer to:

Places
Terra Cotta, California, a small former mining town in the USA
Terra Cotta, Illinois, an unincorporated community in the USA
Terra Cotta, Ontario, a community in Caledon, Ontario, Canada

Other uses
Terra cotta (color), a reddish-brown colour
Terracotta, Inc., a software company

See also
Terracotta Army, ancient Chinese funerary warrior and horse statues
Architectural terracotta
Glazed architectural terra-cotta